Agosto is a 1987 French drama film directed by Jorge Silva Melo.

Cast
Agostinho Alves
Alice Aurélio
Norberto Barroca ...  Dário (voice)
Rita Blanco
José Mário Branco
Ana Bustorff
António Capelo
Marie Carré
Sérgio Costa Andrade
Olivier Cruveiller
Manuela de Freitas
Diogo Dória
Luís Fraga
José Pedro Gomes ...  Carlos (voice)
Egito Gonçalves
Pedro Hestnes
Alexandra Lencastre ...  Alda (voice)
Rui Madeira
José Manuel Mendes
Fernando Mora Ramos
José Nascimento
Vítor Norte
Christian Patey
Ângela Peixoto
Silvina Pereira
Erica Porru
Glicínia Quartin
Isabel Ruth
Luís Santos

External links 

1987 films
1980s French-language films
1987 drama films
French drama films
1980s French films